Koilaletoi or Coilaletae or Coelaletae is the name of a Thracian tribe. Other parts of this tribe were, the Coelaletae Maiores and Coelaletae Minores. They are mentioned by Tacitus.

See also
List of Thracian tribes

References

Ancient tribes in Thrace
Thracian tribes